Nelon Troy Pascal (born  25 April 1987 in St David's, Grenada) is a cricketer who has represented the West Indies in Tests and One Day Internationals (ODIs). He is a fast bowler who bats and bowls right handed. His main first-class and List A cricket has been for the Windward Islands. He played for the West Indies in the 2006 U-19 Cricket World Cup in Sri Lanka. He spent 2008 in England playing club cricket for Boldon CC in the Durham Senior League.

Nelon was selected for the West Indies tour squad to England in 2009 where he played in the warm up matches against Essex and Derbyshire. He made his first international appearance in 2009 in an ODI against Bangladesh, this was followed by two appearances for the Test side in 2010.

References

1987 births
Living people
Grenadian cricketers
Saint Lucia Kings cricketers
West Indies Test cricketers
West Indies One Day International cricketers
Windward Islands cricketers
People from Saint David Parish, Grenada